Emmanuel Church of the Evangelical Association of Binghamton, now Our Free Will Baptist Church, is a historic Evangelical church located at Binghamton in Broome County, New York.  It was built in 1884 and is a large rectangular, wood-frame building, three bays wide and seven bays deep, on a stone foundation.  It is two stories tall on the front elevation and, because of a steep drop off, four stories on the remaining sides.  It features a steep gable roof and engaged bell tower.  The variegated random ashlar stone siding was added about 1952, when a rear addition was completed.

It was listed on the National Register of Historic Places in 2009.

References

Churches completed in 1884
19th-century Protestant churches
Churches on the National Register of Historic Places in New York (state)
Churches in Broome County, New York
National Register of Historic Places in Broome County, New York
Buildings and structures in Binghamton, New York